The 1990 ICF Canoe Sprint World Championships were held in Poznań, Poland on Lake Malta.

The men's competition consisted of eight Canadian (single paddle, open boat) and nine kayak events. Five events were held for the women, all in kayak.

This was the 23rd championships in canoe sprint.

Medal summary

Men's

Canoe

Kayak

Women's

Kayak

Medals table

References
ICF medalists for Olympic and World Championships - Part 1: flatwater (now sprint): 1936-2007.
ICF medalists for Olympic and World Championships - Part 2: rest of flatwater (now sprint) and remaining canoeing disciplines: 1936-2007.

Icf Canoe Sprint World Championships, 1990
Icf Canoe Sprint World Championships, 1990
ICF Canoe Sprint World Championships
Canoeing
Sport in Poznań
Canoeing and kayaking competitions in Poland